Phyllonorycter extincta is a moth of the family Gracillariidae. It is known from Tunisia.

The larvae feed on Quercus coccifera and Quercus suber. They mine the leaves of their host plant.

References

extincta
Endemic fauna of Tunisia
Moths described in 1974
Moths of Africa